Coimbatore is the second largest city in the state of Tamilnadu in India. The major arterial roads in the city are Avinashi Road, Trichy Road, Pollachi Road, Sathy Road , Palakkad Road, Mettupalayam Road and Thadagam Road. Coimbatore city is served by many flyovers. Avinashi road flyover in Coimbatore was built in 1974 and was the second flyover to be opened in Tamil Nadu after the Anna flyover in Chennai. It was also the first grade separator in India to have a roundabout.

Gallery

Flyovers in Coimbatore
Avinashi Road flyover
North Coimbatore Flyover
Hope College Flyover
Ondipudur Flyover.
Sungam Bypass Flyover
Textool Flyover,Ganapathy
Gandhipuram Flyover
Podanur Flyover
Singanallur- Vellalore Road Flyover
Ukkadam Flyover (Under Construction)
Trichy Road Flyover
Peelamedu RS Flyover
Nanjundapuram flyover
Avinashi Road Expressway, Coimbatore (under construction)
Ondipudur-Irugur Flyover
Irugur Pirivu-Irugur Flyover
Goundampalayam-GN Mills Flyover (under construction)
Tidel Park Road Flyover (under construction)
Avarampalayam - Ganapathy Road Flyover 
Ganapathy - Rathnapuri Road Flyover 
SIHS Colony Road Flyover (under construction)
Neelikonampalayam Road Flyover (under construction)
Eachanari Flyover 
Sundarapuram - Eachanari Road Flyover
Singanallur Flyover (planned, construction starts in March 2022)
Thudiyalur Flyover (planned, construction starts in March 2022)
Saibaba Colony Flyover (planned, construction starts in March 2022)
Saravanampatty Flyover (planned, construction starts in March 2022)

See also
Transport in Coimbatore

References

Coimbatore